Sydney Weekender is an Australian travel show featuring destinations throughout the state of New South Wales. The program debuted in 1994 on Saturdays at 5:30pm, later moving to Sundays at the same time before the local nightly news bulletin. It is hosted by Sam Mac and airs on the Seven Network in New South Wales and nationally on 7Two.

The program visits various locations in the state highlighting activities, attractions, and dining options.

Sydney Weekender reached a milestone of 750 episodes on 18 August 2012. The series has spawned spin-offs including Melbourne Weekender.

Many of the locations featured in the program have a commercial arrangement whereby they have bought advertisements or paid to be featured in an episode. In November 2019, the Seven Network announced the show had been axed with the final episodes screening in early 2020. However, a number of travel shows axed by Seven including Sydney Weekender, were thrown a lifeline after a backlash to cost-cutting plans and sponsors.

Sydney Weekender has since returned for a full series, since 2021, exploring the best attractions, experiences and destinations across New South Wales. All episodes are available to stream anytime on 7plus.

In January 2022, Seven Network announced that Matt Shirvington will join as a host, replacing the long running host Mike Whitney. The final episode with Witney premiered on January 30, 2022, episodes with Shirvington will be premiering on February 6, 2022 

In January 2023, Seven Network announced that Sam Mac will replace Matt Shirvington as host of the show. Shirvington will concentrate on his growing Seven News and Seven Sport commitments.

Presenters
 Candice Dixon
 Daniel Gibson
 Darren Coggan
 Felicity Urquhart
 Erica Davis
 James Tobin
 Jack Yabsley
 Karen Ledbury
 Lizzy Lovette
 Luke Carroll
 Matt Baseley
 Mel Symons
 Peter Wells
 Sam Mac (host)
 Sally Stanton
 Sophie Falkiner
 Teigan Nash

Past presenters
 Cameron Williams (original host 1994)
 Ada Nicodemou
 Nuala Hafner
 Tim Campbell
Sally Obermeder
Greg Page
PJ Lane
Melissa Doyle
Sonia Kruger
Johanna Griggs
Mark Beretta
Georgie Gardner
Sophie Falkiner
Amber Sherlock
Andrew Ettinghausen
Monique Wright
Rahni Sadler
Ann Sanders
Leigh Hatcher
Kylie Gillies
Rose Jacobs
Jason Stevens
 Rebecca Stevens
 Matt Shirvington

See also 
 Melbourne Weekender
 Queensland Weekender
 WA Weekender
 SA Weekender

References

External links
Sydney Weekender at the National Film and Sound Archive

Seven Network original programming
Australian non-fiction television series
Television shows set in Sydney
Australian travel television series
1994 Australian television series debuts
2000s Australian television series
2010s Australian television series